Phlegmariurus loxensis is a species of plant in the family Lycopodiaceae. It is endemic to Ecuador, where it occurs in the páramo and forests of the Andes. It is threatened by fire in its habitat.

References

loxensis
Endemic flora of Ecuador
Endangered plants
Páramo flora
Taxonomy articles created by Polbot
Taxobox binomials not recognized by IUCN